Stevan Jelovac (8 July 19895 December 2021) was a Serbian professional basketball player.

Professional career
Jelovac started his senior career with Vizura. On 25 August 2009, he signed with Mega Vizura. On 7 April 2010, he left Mega and signed with Crvena zvezda for the rest of the season. On 19 July 2010, he re-signed with Zvezda. On 16 November 2010, he parted ways with Zvezda and returned to Mega for the rest of the 2010–11 season.

On 15 June 2011, Jelovac signed with Antalya BŞB for the 2011–12 season.

On 10 July 2012, Jelovac signed a two-year deal with JuveCaserta. After one season, he parted ways with Caserta.

On 31 July 2013, Jelovac signed with Lietuvos rytas for the 2013–14 season.

On 4 July 2014, Jelovac signed a one-year deal with Spanish club  CAI Zaragoza. On 13 June 2015, he re-signed with Zaragoza for one more season. In July 2016, he joined the Dallas Mavericks for the 2016 NBA Summer League. On 27 July 2016, he re-signed with Zaragoza for the 2016–17 season.

On 13 July 2017, Jelovac signed with Russian club Nizhny Novgorod for the 2017–18 season.

On 8 July 2018, Jelovac signed with the German club Brose Bamberg.

On 8 February 2019, Jelovac signed with the Turkish club Gaziantep Basketbol.

On 8 June 2020, he signed with San-en NeoPhoenix of the Japanese B.League.

On 23 August 2021, Jelovac signed with AEK Athens of the Greek Basket League and the Basketball Champions League. On 14 November 2021, during a practice session, he suffered a brain hemorrhage.

In Jelovac's honor, AEK Athens retired his #13 jersey on 14 December 2021.

Death and funeral
Jelovac died in Novi Sad on 5 December 2021 from complications due to a brain hemorrhage, at the age of 32. He was buried at the Novi Sad City Cemetery two days later. After the Holy Liturgy, speech wes given by Aleksandar Jovančević. Funeral service was also attended by numerous sportspeople of Serbia and Greece including Predrag Danilović, Zlatko Bolić, Milenko Tepić, Mlađan Šilobad, Veselin Petrović, Vasa Mijić, and Đorđe Đurić.

Career statistics

EuroLeague

|-
| style="text-align:left;"| 2013–14
| style="text-align:left;"| Lietuvos rytas
| 10 || 0 || 13.6 || .414 || .192 || .615 || 2.3 || .3 || .6 || .1 || 6.1 || 4.0
|- class="sortbottom"
| style="text-align:center;" colspan=2| Career
| 10 || 0 || 13.6 || .414 || .192 || .615 || 2.3 || .3 || .6 || .1 || 6.1 || 4.0

See also
 List of basketball players who died during their careers

References

External links

 Stevan Jelovac at acb.com
 Stevan Jelovac at eurobasket.com
 Stevan Jelovac at euroleague.net
 Stevan Jelovac at tblstat.net

1989 births
2021 deaths
AEK B.C. players
ABA League players
Antalya Büyükşehir Belediyesi players
Basketball League of Serbia players
Basket Zaragoza players
BC Rytas players
BC Nizhny Novgorod players
Brose Bamberg players
Gaziantep Basketbol players
Juvecaserta Basket players
KK Crvena zvezda players
KK Mega Basket players
KK Vizura players
Liga ACB players
Power forwards (basketball)
Serbian expatriate basketball people in Germany
Serbian expatriate basketball people in Italy
Serbian expatriate basketball people in Japan
Serbian expatriate basketball people in Lithuania
Serbian expatriate basketball people in Russia
Serbian expatriate basketball people in Spain
Serbian expatriate basketball people in Turkey
Serbian men's basketball players
Basketball players from Novi Sad